Crivitz is a town in the Ludwigslust-Parchim district, in Mecklenburg-Western Pomerania, Germany. It is situated 18 km east of Schwerin. The founder of the town Crivitz, Wisconsin named it after his hometown Crivitz. It has a friendship link with Seaford, East Sussex. The lake Barniner See is located nearby.

Sons and daughters of the city 
 Matthias Breitkreutz (born 1971), soccer player
  (* 1961), writer
  (1906–1983), shipbuilder
 Heiko Mathias Förster (born 1966), conductor
 Armin Kremer (born 1968), rally driver
 Karla Roffeis (born 1958), volleyball player
 Torsten Schmitz (born 1964), box coach and former amateur boxer
  (born 1965), politician (BVB/FW)
 Kevin Wölbert (born 1989), speedway driver

Villages within the municipality 
 Augustenhof
 Badegow
 Basthorst
 Gädebehn
 Kladow
 Muchelwitz
 Radepohl
 Wessin

References 

Cities and towns in Mecklenburg
Ludwigslust-Parchim
Populated places established in the 1300s
1300s establishments in the Holy Roman Empire
1300 establishments in Europe
Grand Duchy of Mecklenburg-Schwerin